Danny is a 2014 National Film Board of Canada documentary film about former Newfoundland and Labrador premier Danny Williams, co-directed by Justin Simms and William D. MacGillivray, and produced by Annette Clarke.

The film took three years to produce, combining photos, archival footage, dramatic re-enactments and interviews with Williams, key staffers, his mother Teresita Galway Williams, and Newfoundland celebrities including Greg Malone. The film documents Williams' seven years as premier, including his clash with Prime Minister Stephen Harper over equalization payments and his subsequent Anything But Conservative campaign during the Canadian federal election. Danny also documents Williams' early years, which coincided with Newfoundland's entry into the Canadian Confederation, his career as a criminal lawyer as well as his success in business as the founder of Cable Atlantic, before entering politics. Williams also pokes fun at himself in the film, appearing in a Godfather parody with Newfoundland actor Gordon Pinsent. 
 
Co-director Simms has stated that their intention was not only to make a biographical documentary, "but to frame it within Newfoundland’s very up and down post-confederation relationship with Canada."

Release
The 84-minute film premiered in Halifax on September 13, 2014, at the Atlantic Film Festival. It then screened at Arts and Culture Centres across Newfoundland and Labrador, starting November 10, 2014. The film was selected to the 2015 Hot Docs Canadian International Documentary Festival, screening as part of its Big Ideas Series, with Williams in attendance.

References

External links

2014 films
2014 documentary films
National Film Board of Canada documentaries
Documentary films about Canadian politicians
Politics of Newfoundland and Labrador
Films set in Newfoundland and Labrador
Films shot in Newfoundland and Labrador
Films directed by William D. MacGillivray
Films directed by Justin Simms
2010s English-language films
2010s Canadian films